The Global Trade Exchange (GTX) is, or was, a controversial Homeland Security intelligence project, related to maritime-ports data-mining, being one of three pillars of the Safe Ports Act-related Secure Freight Initiatives.  The Global Trade Exchange has a mysterious history dating from conception in 2004, a 2007-2008 year of hype, and sudden placement on "hold" status.  Described as a ready-to-buy, commercially available database, the GTX was rush-funded by Congress as part of and championed relentlessly by then-United States Secretary of Homeland Security Michael Chertoff in evident disregard of objections of confused and frustrated U.S. private sector trade groups.  After a year-long spate of official support, media hype, and after award of Congressional funding of $13 million, the GTX was put "on hold for further study by the [U.S.] Navy" in April 2008, for reasons still yet to-be explained.  Touted by senior U.S. officials and Congress in 2007 as an anti-terrorism database for tracking long-haul shipping containers, the Global Trade Exchange's principal focus appears to have a different focus, notably advance trade-finance information for market-making purposes.

The Global Trade Exchange (GTX) was mentioned in a 2007 Wikileaks cable as an intelligence agency trade data project, run by the Department of Homeland Security, Customs and Border Protection, intended to involve many other intelligence agencies worldwide.

DHS Intelligence Trade Data Project 

In Spring of 2007 DHS Secretary Michael Chertoff began to actively promote the Global Trade Exchange to the media and trade community as a commercial off-the-shelf (COTS) database, able to provide unique and  vital national security protection from 'all hazards' threats,  Senior DHS Customs officials, described the GTX as a repository of corporate data, and transportation shipping data.  Congress noted the GTX description as a COTS tool and placed it into the July 2007 Homeland Security Appropriations budget bill; this done above the vociferous objections of the U.S. private sector.  Three major U.S. trade consortia rendered written and spoken testimony to Congress, expressing concerns about the sudden arrival of this new tool, the secrecy surrounding it, as well as posing questions as to why the U.S. Government would be sharing collected corporate data with foreign governments, such as Secretary Chertoff described.

Ports-related "Financial Services Data Warehouse" 

Full cooperation, therefore, in current US risk-analytic data collection (including the future Global Trade Exchange—GTX experiment) and in US Container Security Initiative risk-based scanning is certainly highly counseled as a means to mitigate domestic US pressure for more extreme overseas surveillance requirements. Jon D. Glassman, Northrop Grumman.

GTX was championed by former State Department official Jon D. Glassman most famous for having drafted the  White Paper on El Salvador and for serving as Chargé des Affairs in the U.S. Embassy in Afghanistan during CIA operations to support the Mujahadeen.  Between 2004–2007, Mr. Glassman championed the Global Trade Exchange at various APEC counter-terrorism meetings and intergovernmental meetings in the Middle East, as a means of foregoing U.S. Congressional requirements for 100 per cent scanning of shipping containers.

As early as 2004, Ambassador Glassman proposed, at various APEC counter-terrorism seminars, the Global Trade Exchange as an unregulated financial exchange using port-shipping manifest data, i.e. as a Northrop Grumman-led Financial Services Data Warehouse. A relationship to stock-trading was clear, but the relationship to counter-terrorism not.  Many U.S. financial services sector presented this kind of tool for hedge-fund risk management.

2007: DHS Secretary Chertoff spearheads project 

"DHS," Chertoff said, "is piloting, on a voluntary basis, a system that would provide expanded global access to trade information." This system would involve the submission of an even broader range of data by a wider variety of supply chain actors to a third-party global trade exchange (GTX) that could be accessed by government agencies. More information would allow CBP to be more precise in identifying risks and to thus conduct fewer and better-targeted container inspections. Chertoff stressed that the GTX operator would be a "trusted aggregator" and that there would be "a stringent rule set" to make sure that sensitive business information is not "divulged or shared to competitors." He noted that CBP hopes to put out a request for proposal on such a system in the "very near future"."

Although never fully explained in terms of content, the Global Trade Exchange was noted as being one of the three pillars of the U.S. Customs and Border Protection (CBP) strategy for trade data-gathering.

The Global Trade Exchange was touted as a ready-made project run by a private-sector company in cooperation with foreign governments; data was to have been obtained on a voluntary basis by companies.  On July 26, 2007 Senator Patty Murray added the GTX to the Department of Homeland Security Appropriations budget, by adding Amendment (S.2499) into H.R. 2638.

Controversy about secrecy 

U.S. trade groups expressed strong  displeasure at the sudden implementation of the new project, as well as with the general lack of transparency, public interaction, and disclosure about GTX.  These groups found the lack of information regarding justification for, and modalities such as were related to, data-sharing with foreign governments, particularly disturbing.

These U.S. trade groups provided formal complaints and testimony to various Federal agencies, as well as various Congressional Committees and Subcommittees.  These communications noted concerns that they didn't know the business-reporting sources of data nor what the data were; these groups were normally very involved with such definitions. Also, DHS mentions of using the GTX to share private sector data with foreign governments caused US industry risible worries about business data confidentiality.   In December 2007, a request for quote and statement of work were put forth by the DHS.

Congressional funding awarded in July 2007 

Despite the controversy, Global Trade Exchange was allocated $13 million as part of the DHS section of the 2008 Consolidated Appropriations Budget, in January 2008.  Northrop Grumman presented the GTX in late February as part of wider DOD supply-chain "GEX" data-warehousing projects.

This legislation was drafted by House Homeland Security Chief Counsel Denise Krepp.

"U.S. Attorneys involved in appropriating the database in October 2007 

On 30 October 2007, Deputy Commissioner of Customs Thomas S. Winkowski testified to Rep. Henry Cuellar that U.S. Attorneys were still trying to "go around the legal challenges that [the U.S. government] had in obtaining the database and that Customs was "Still trying to get our arms around" the Global Trade Exchange, so that they could "know what's inside it".

Discussed by the Senate Finance Committee in March 2008 

On March 13, 2008, the Global Trade Exchange was discussed in the Senate Finance Committee, as part of the data-gathering program framework of the Homeland Security Department.   The topic was presented by Mr. Sam Banks, Executive Vice President of Sandler and Travis Trade Advisory Services, the firm which won the no-bid award for the GTX in January 2008.  Sandler, Travis and Rosenberg is a customs law and international trade consultancy firm known for management of the IBERC database used under the GATT textiles agreement, the Multifibre arrangement (MFA).

Global Trade Exchange project 

Despite that the GTX was, in principle, a ready-to-purchase database of corporate data which was collected, the actual content of the global trade exchange was never fully presented to either the media nor to U.S. trade groups.  Clues to the premise of the project can be found in the GTX statement of work, provided in the 2008 request for quote, released to a small select group of companies, in December 2008.

 GTX is envisioned as a privately operated, self-sustaining (e.g. user-fee based) trade information system that will collect commercial transaction data not currently available to us from parties in the supply chain who have contracted or provided services for the production/movement of international shipments and allow government and trade community participants to input and access trade data through an information broker on an expanded global basis. Data maintained by the GTX broker will be available to participating customs agencies 24X7 in the appropriate technical format.

The commercial transaction data was to have been run by a private company information broker performing the following functions:  

 Collection, integration, and transmission of data and images from multiple sources;
 Coordinating the participation of all supply chain parties (e.g. foreign host governments & shippers) providing information to GTX;
 Establishing and maintaining all necessary communications and interfaces;
 Ensuring protection of all collected and/or transmitted by the GTX;
 Transmitting data to participating foreign government systems in compliance with foreign government requirements.

March 2008: GTX on hold for further study 
Three weeks after public presentations at U.S. trade conferences, and two months after funding was awarded by Congress, DHS customs official Jayon Ahern announced publicly that the project was premature, and would be delayed for further study.; it remained delayed as from Basham's departure, yet is again part of the 2009 DHS appropriations budget and remains under study for future implementation.  In the U.S. House, House Homeland Security Appropriations Chairman  David Price (D-NC) has repeatedly expressed wishes for results on the project.  As late as May 1, 2009 Commissioner Ahern was providing explanations to Congressman David Price about the DHS ongoing pursuit to find the commercially available COTS database.

Global Trade Exchange in Wikileaks 

Wikileaks documents revealed the U.S. Customs and Border Protection (CBP) activity in "selling" the Global Trade Exchange (GTX) to the international intelligence community in a cable from Wellington New Zealand, which stated that 
"CBP agreed to provide the members of the international intelligence community with information on its proposed Global Trade Exchange (GTX) initiative so that each member may determine its interest in participating in a trial of the data exchange. Additional information will be brought to the next international intelligence community meeting for GNZ consideration"

Noting that the U.S. Customs and Border Protection would

Provide the members of the international intelligence community with information on the proposed Global Trade Exchange (GTX) initiative so that each member could determine its interest in participating in a trial of the data exchange

See also 
Chemical, biological, radiological, and nuclear
Container Security Initiative
Denise Krepp
Global Initiative to Combat Nuclear Terrorism
Nuclear proliferation
Proliferation Security Initiative
United States House Committee on Homeland Security

References

United States Department of Homeland Security
Propaganda in the United States